History of English law is the history of the legal system and laws of England. 

Coverage of the history of English law is provided by:

 Fundamental Laws of England
 History of English land law
 History of English contract law
 History of English criminal law

 History of trial by jury in England
 History of the courts of England and Wales

See also
 Commentaries on the Laws of England (book) 1765, by Sir William Blackstone
 Institutes of the Lawes of England (book) 1628, by Sir Edward Coke

 English parliamentary history
 Anglo-Saxon law
 Common law

 Legal history of England